Bill Findlay (29 October 1913 – 28 May 1986) was an Australian rules footballer who played with Footscray and North Melbourne in the Victorian Football League (VFL). He played as a rover and was sometimes pushed forward where he was a handy goalkicker, averaging two goals a game.

Findlay was started his league career with his local side Footscray and played his first game of VFL in 1933. He managed just the one game in his debut season and four in the next prompting him to move to North Melbourne in 1935.

He took over the captaincy partway through the 1941 VFL season and remained in that position until the end of 1943. His leadership role expanded to captain and coach for the latter part of 1942 and the entire 1943 season. During this time Findlay found himself resting in the forward pocket and was North's leading goal kicker in 1943, 1944 and 1945.

In 1946 he joined Port Melbourne Football Club in the Victorian Football Association (VFA) and started with 88 goals in his first season, including winning the Best and Fairest, and kicking 107 in his next. As captain-coach he led the club to the premiership in 1947. In 1954 Findlay moved to fellow VFA team Coburg Football Club as coach but made a brief return to playing for two matches in 1955, aged 41, during an injury crisis at Coburg.

Findlay was later named as a rover in Port Melbourne's official 'Team of the Century'.

References

Sources
 Atkinson, G. (1982) Everything you ever wanted to know about Australian rules football but couldn't be bothered asking, The Five Mile Press: Melbourne. .

External links

1913 births
Australian rules footballers from Victoria (Australia)
Western Bulldogs players
Western Bulldogs coaches
North Melbourne Football Club players
North Melbourne Football Club coaches
Syd Barker Medal winners
Port Melbourne Football Club players
Port Melbourne Football Club coaches
Coburg Football Club coaches
Coburg Football Club players
J. J. Liston Trophy winners
1986 deaths